Goodtimes is the flagship channel of Lifestyle & Media Broadcasting Ltd. It was launched in September 2007.

Rebranding
Goodtimes underwent a makeover in November 2013 to redefine the lifestyle entertainment category codes once again. From being India's oldest lifestyle channel, it became its youngest with programming that is impulsive, interactive and with an attitude that resonates with the youth. The new logo, icons, indents and a vibrant and dynamic colour palette are a testament to the channel's continuing evolution as India’s premier lifestyle entertainment destination.

Awards
Goodtimes has won several programming awards at the Indian Television Academy Awards, Indian Telly Awards and World Media Festival for key shows and interstitials like Highway On My Plate, Band Baajaa Bride with Sabyasachi, No Big Deal and Making of the Kingfisher Calendar.

In 2015, Goodtimes won topmost honours at the Gourmand World Cookbook Awards, one of the most prestigious awards in the world of culinary writing, for the books Highway On My Plate II by Rocky & Mayur, and Vicky Goes Veg by chef Vicky Ratnani in three categories – Best Culinary Travel Book and Best TV, English, and Best Vegetarian Cookbook. Judged as the 'Best Fashion & Lifestyle Channel' at the ITA (Indian Television Academy) Awards for two consecutive years, Goodtimes is beamed directly across international markets such as US, UK, Singapore, Sri Lanka, Mauritius and Maldives.

Shows
 Around The World in 85 Plates
 Bachelor's Kitchen
 Band Baajaa Bride
 Big Fat Indian Wedding
 Bolly Food
 Breaking Bread with Dino Morea
 Breaking Bread with Rohit Bal
 Breaking Bread with Ramola Bachchan
 Breaking Bread with Riyaaz Amlani
 Bucket List Costa Smeralda
 Bucket List Mauritius
 Chakh le Academy
 Chakh le India
 Chakh le India - Kachcha Raasta
 Check Out China
 Confessions of a Travel Bag
 Cook Eat 'n' Party
 Custom Made for Vir Sanghvi
 Dubai Diaries
 Fat Man & 13 Brides
 The First Ladies
 Foodistan
 FoodMAD
 Gadget Guru
 Game On Singapore
 Get Fit with Rocky and Mayur
 Get The Look
 Gourmet Central
 Great Drives
 Guilt Free
 Heavy Petting
 Highway On My Plate
 I am Too Sexy for My Shoes
 Imagine Your Korea
 India Explored Manipur
 In The Spotlight!
 Jai Hind with Rocky & Mayur
 Kingfisher Supermodels
 Life's A Beach
 Lock Stock and Two Smoking Tikkas
 Love Bites With Joey
 Luxe Interiors
 The Lounge
 Making of the Kingfisher Calendar
 My Yellow Table
 Nirvana Travels
 No Big Deal
 Olive It Up
 One Life to Love
 Royal Reservation
 Spectacular Spas Around The World
 Spectacular Spas For Men
 Swiss Made Adventures
 Swiss Made Challenge
 Swiss Made Dreams
 Swiss Made Grand Tour
 Ten Things To Do Before You Say Bye
 Ten Things To Do Around The World
 The Buzz
 The Mavericks
 Travelling Diva
 Vicky Goes Desi
 Vicky Goes Foreign - Canada Tadka
 Vicky Goes Veg
 Warrior Tribes of Nagaland
 A Whole New World
 Yarri Dostii Shaadi
 Yoga City
 Yogasutra
 You Got Magic with Neel Madhav
 Zaika India Ka

Anchors
 Ambika Anand
 Bharat Arora
 Aditya Bal
 Freishia Bomanbehram
 Seema Chandra
 Vikram Chandra
 Rasik Chopra
 Samara Chopra
 Ritu Dalmia
 Neha Dixit
 Amrita Gandhi
 Arlette Evita Grao
 Kaisha Hastu
 Rajat Kapoor
 Kunal Kapur
 Neel Madhav
 Rajiv Makhni
 Joey Matthew
 Karuna Ezaara Parikh
 Vicky Ratnani
 Seema Rehmani
 Ayesha Sharma
 Mayur Sharma
 Rocky Singh
 Perizaad Zorabian
 Ridhi Dogra
 Sarah Jayne Bedford
 Neha Dhupia
 Maya Hendricks
 Marut Sikka
 Varun Mitra
 Rahul Khanna
 Sumona Chakravarti
 Meiyang Chang

References

External links
 

Food and drink television
Television stations in New Delhi
English-language television stations in India
2007 establishments in Delhi